Punta Tersiva (French: Pointe Tersive) (3,512m) is a mountain of the Graian Alps in Aosta Valley, north-western Italy. It is described as an "elegant, pyramid shaped mountain".

The mountain is a tough climb, and most of the famous peaks of the Alps are visible from its summit on a clear day, with Gran Paradiso especially visible.

References

Mountains of the Alps
Alpine three-thousanders
Mountains of Aosta Valley